Mansoor Khan (born 20 February 1997) is a Pakistani professional footballer who plays as a midfielder for Pakistan Airforce.

He won the National Challenge Cup twice with Pakistan Airforce, winning the first in 2014 and second in 2018.

Early life and career
Mansoor was born in Mardan, Khyber Pakhtunkhwa. He started his career with hometown team Mardan Blue Star.

Club career

Pakistan Airforce

Debut season: 2011–2014
Mansoor joined Pakistan Airforce in 2011. He made just seven appearances in 2011–12 season, scoring his only goal of the season was a winner against Pakistan Airlines at 77th minute in a 2–1 victory.
In 2012–13 season Mansoor made 13 appearances providing four assists. In 2013–14 season, he was barely used in the league although he competed in all of the 2014 National Football Challenge Cup matches for the team, scoring in a 3–2 group stage defeat to Habib Bank and scored the winner against Karachi Electric Supply Corporation in the finals, scoring at 76th minute.

2014–present
Mansoor scored his first goal of the 2014–15 season against Karachi Port Trust in a 3–2 defeat. Mansoor ended his season with 18 goals in 22 appearances, finishing second to K-Electric's Muhammad Rasool for the golden boot, he won the player of the year award that season.

On 13 October 2016, Mansoor scored his first hat-trick against Punjab in All Pakistan Shama Challenge Football Cup, scoring the goals in 7th, 17th and 56th minute as Pakistan Airforce won the match 5–0. Mansoor scored the winner against Khan Research Laboratories in quarter-finals on 53rd minute.

References

External links 
 Mansoor Khan
 
 

1997 births
Living people
Pakistani footballers
Pakistan international footballers
Association football midfielders
Footballers at the 2014 Asian Games
Footballers at the 2018 Asian Games
Asian Games competitors for Pakistan
PAF F.C. players